Bert Deems May (born March 6, 1969) is a former tight end who played eight seasons in the National Football League. Currently, he is a radio host for the North Carolina Tar Heels.

1969 births
American football tight ends
Living people
North Carolina Tar Heels football players
Players of American football from North Carolina
People from Davidson County, North Carolina
People from Lexington, North Carolina
San Diego Chargers players
Seattle Seahawks players